Edward Wojewódzki (born 17 November 1937) is a former football coach and manager. Wojewódzki only had one management job in football which was with Lechia Gdańsk in 1982. After a 4–0 defeat in the final months of the season Wojewódzki took over from Michał Globisz with the aim of keeping Lechia in the division. This did not happen, and Lechia were relegated to the third tier for the first time in ten years.

References

1937 births
Lechia Gdańsk managers
Polish football managers
Living people